Namandia is a monotypic genus of Australian intertidal spiders containing the single species, Namandia periscelis. It was first described by Pekka T. Lehtinen in 1967, and has only been found in Australia.

References

Desidae
Monotypic Araneomorphae genera
Spiders of Australia
Taxa named by Pekka T. Lehtinen